Fisher Towers are a series of towers made of Cutler sandstone capped with Moenkopi sandstone and caked with a stucco of red mud located near Moab, Utah. The Towers are named for a miner who lived near them in the 1880s. The Towers are world-renowned as a subject for photography and for its classic rock climbing routes.

Location 
The area is generally accessed from Fisher Towers Road off of Route 128 which runs along the Colorado River between I-70 and Route 191.

The Towers lie just south of a larger mesa which they are emerging from on a geological time scale.  north of the main formation there is a tower which has only partway emerged from the mesa. The Towers are composed of three major fins of rock that run from the northeast closer to the mesa out to the southwest and into a desert valley. Each fin contains multiple towers, a number of which have been named.

The easternmost section of the northernmost fin is dominated by a tower known as the King Fisher. The ridge line of the fin drops considerable before reaching the western formation called Ancient Arts. Ancient Arts is composed of four separate summits the most striking of which is the cork screw summit. The Middle fin is split into two very distinct towers known as Echo Tower in the east and Cottontail in the west. The southernmost fin is best known for containing the Fisher Towers with the greatest elevation and prominence, a structure named Titan Tower. The eastern portion of the southern fin is the less well known Oracle which physically connects back to the mesa.

The area has many other named structures, such as the Cobra (which collapsed, presumably due to a lightning strike, sometime in the final week of July 2014) and the Sundial, both found in between King Fisher and Echo Tower. Each consists of balanced rocks perched above smaller supports. Another example is the Lizard Rock, a  tower near the parking lot.

Rock climbing 
Development of Fisher Towers as climbing areas start in the early 1960s. The first notable technical climb was a route called the Finger of Fate, which summits Titan Tower and was later featured in Fifty Classic Climbs of North America.  The Towers are also very well known for the cork screw summit of the Ancient Arts tower, most commonly accessed by the Stolen Chimney route. Photographs of the unusual cork screw summit have been extensively published in many settings including mainstream advertisements.

In film 
The Fisher Towers were featured in the opening scene of Austin Powers in Goldmember.

Television commercials, advertisements, and even scenes from famous movies have been filmed in the area of Moab, Utah (where the Fisher Towers are located).

Gallery

Guidebooks

References

External links 

 
 
 
 

Mountains of Utah
Geology of Utah
Climbing areas of Utah
Rock formations of Utah
Landforms of Grand County, Utah
Protected areas of Grand County, Utah
Bureau of Land Management areas in Utah